Matthew Benedict Stadlen (born 7 December 1979) is a journalist, author, presenter and photographer.

He was a weekend presenter on LBC between October 2016 and September 2020, hosting more than 400 shows. He also stood in for other presenters on the station during the week. He previously presented the BBC interview series Five Minutes With... and the BBC documentary series "On the Road with...". His interviews and documentaries have appeared across the BBC television network, including on BBC One, Two and Four. He also wrote comment pieces and had an interview column with The Daily Telegraph, "The Matthew Stadlen Interview". He has presented over 150 live events and podcasts for How To Academy.

Background
Stadlen was born to Sir Nicholas Stadlen, a High Court judge, and Frances Stadlen in London. He is the grandson of concert pianist Peter Stadlen and Hedi Stadlen, the activist and musicologist, both Austrian Jews born in Vienna.

He attended St Paul's School (of which his maternal grandfather Thomas Howarth had been High Master), and later graduated from Clare College, Cambridge, with a first-class honours degree in Classics.

He considers himself half Jewish and has spoken in support of resisting anti-Semitism.

Career
Stadlen worked as a journalist on The Bulletin in Brussels and co-wrote The Politics Companion (2004), before joining the BBC in September 2004.

He worked as a producer on the BBC One show This Week and output edited some of the programmes, and also worked on Newsnight. He produced the General Election Event on BBC One in 2010 and coverage of the US election from New York on BBC One (This Week) and BBC Two (The Daily Politics) in 2008.

Stadlen presented and produced Five Minutes With... from 2008, interviewing over 220 public figures, including Elle Macpherson, Stephen Fry, Richard Dawkins, Martin Amis, Peter Hitchens, Serena Williams and Ricky Gervais. He made 29 documentaries for the BBC News Channel series On The Road With.... Subjects included Nigel Kennedy, Tracey Emin, Nicola Benedetti, Rabbi Dr Harvey Belovski, Stuart Broad, Eton head master Tony Little, Bryn Terfel and Elle Macpherson.

Stadlen has interviewed for The Spectator and extensively for the Radio Times, and has worked as a consultant on the ITV political programme, Peston on Sunday. He also had an interview column with The Daily Telegraph, "The Matthew Stadlen Interview", for which he interviewed famous figures including John Cleese, Sir David Attenborough and Dawn French.

He is the author of How To See Birds, published by Papadakis and illustrated with his own photographs from home and abroad.

References

External links
 

1979 births
Living people
English people of Austrian-Jewish descent
Television personalities from London
Alumni of Clare College, Cambridge
English male journalists
British political journalists
British television presenters
British television producers
BBC television presenters
BBC television producers
People educated at St Paul's School, London
British Jewish families
British Jewish writers